Tezza is a surname. Notable people with the surname include:

Cristóvão Tezza (born 1952), Brazilian novelist and university professor
Luigi Tezza (1841–1923), Italian Roman Catholic priest
Marco Tezza (born 1964), Italian pianist